Moondru Mugam is a 1982 Indian Tamil-language action film directed by A. Jagannathan. The film stars Rajinikanth in three distinct roles as Alex Pandian, Arun and John. The film was a blockbuster and ran for 175 days in theatres. Rajinikanth won the Tamil Nadu State Film Award Special Prize for Best Actor.

The film was remade in Hindi as John Jani Janardhan with Rajinikanth reprising his roles, in Telugu as Mugguru Monagallu (1983) and in Kannada as Gedda Maga.

Plot 
Arun, the son of a rich businessman Ramanathan, returns to India after 10 years in the United States, but as a saint. His shocked father enlists a press reporter, Rekha, to change him back to normal. Rekha first sets up an interview, which he thwarts. Later, on the pretense of taking him to a temple, she plans another set up.

On the way to the temple, Rekha pretends that the car has broken down and he leaves to roam around a bit when sees a crying child and offers a chocolate. Suddenly he is swarmed by more children and other villagers who confront him of being a child-kidnapper. Using the event, Rekha cuts Arun's beard off, a symbol of piety. After a few more set up events, he renounces his sainthood.

Later, Arun goes to work and is puzzled about why his father has been sending money to a woman named Sagaya Mary for over twenty years. In a parallel scenario, a man informs Sagaya Mary that someone has proposed to her nephew John. When asked about John's parentage, she opens up about her brother and John's father, Alex Pandian.

A flashback ensues that explains Alex's story. Alex, a scrupulous police officer, is ruthless on criminals and clashes with the mob boss, Egambaram. After repeated confrontations, Egambaram fatally stabs him. With his last breath, Alex vows that he will be reborn to take revenge. When Alex dies, so does his wife after giving birth to twins. Ramanathan's wife gives birth in the same hospital but the child dies, as with her previous three pregnancies. Sagaya Mary hands over one of Alex's children to them and he is christened Arun, while she raises the other child, John.

On his 25th birthday party, Arun gets a divine epiphany that makes him realise he is the reincarnation of Alex. He is asked to meet a woman named Asha at a hotel but it proves to be a set up. In the ensuing battle for survival, he kills the attacker and goes to jail. He comes to court to reveal the truth when suddenly a man claiming to be Alex shows up and says that he is not dead but had been in Sri Lanka the whole time. The man posing as Alex is actually John. Unknown to Arun, he is working with Egambaram, the man who murdered his father.

Later, Arun tells the police he concocted the fact that he was an incarnation of Alex Pandian to draw the killers out. Soon, John finds the truth about Alex Pandian and Arun and fights to save his brother. However, John is fatally wounded by Egambaram who he eventually kills and throws into the sea, the same way his father was killed. The film ends with Arun and Rekha getting married.

Cast 

Rajinikanth as Alex Pandian, Arun and John
Raadhika as Rekha
Sathyaraj as Dhadi
Senthamarai as Egambaram
Thengai Srinivasan as Ramanathan
Silk Smitha as Asha
Rajyalakshmi as Sheela
Kamala Kamesh as Sagaya Mary
Sangili Murugan as Gopal
V. Gopalakrishnan as Commissioner of police
Poornam Viswanathan as Judge
Delhi Ganesh as Seeni
C. R. Parthiban as D.I.G
Charuhasan as Acharya swamiji (Guest Appearance)
Ennatha Kannaiya as Arun's uncle
Ganthimathi as Gajalakshmi
Loose Mohan as Drunker
Idichapuli Selvaraj as Drunker
Haja Shareef as Mani

Production 
Moondru Mugam was directed by A. Jagannathan and produced by V. Thamizhazhagan and G. Thyagarajan of Sathya Movies. It is the first film where Rajinikanth played three distinct roles. For the role of Alex Pandian, he wore a wig and sported dentures.

Soundtrack 
The soundtrack was composed by Shankar–Ganesh with lyrics written by Vaali, Muthulingam and Vairamuthu.

Release and reception 
Moondru Mugam was released on 1 October 1982. Kalki wrote that portraying the titular three characters differently was an achievement not only for Rajinikanth, but the director too. Rajinikanth won the Tamil Nadu State Film Award Special Prize for Best Actor.

Legacy 
The character "Alex Pandian" became one of the memorable characters in the career of Rajinikanth. The popularity of the character's name inspired the Tamil dubbed version of the Telugu film Mugguru Monagallu (1994) to take on its name, as well as a 2013 film of same name. Chinni Jayanth's character Telex Pandian from Pattukottai Periyappa (1994) was named after Alex. The title Moondru Mugam inspired two unrelated series: one on Polimer TV and another on Zee Tamil.

References

Bibliography

External links 
 

1980s Tamil-language films
1982 action films
1982 films
Fictional portrayals of the Tamil Nadu Police
Films directed by A. Jagannathan
Films scored by Shankar–Ganesh
Indian action films
1980s masala films
Tamil films remade in other languages
Twins in Indian films